Yoo Yeon-seong (born 19 August 1986) is a South Korean professional badminton player.

He specializes in doubles events and was ranked as high as No. 2 worldwide with his former partner, Ko Sung-hyun. The two also competed at the 2012 Summer Olympics.  For a long time he played mixed doubles with Kim Min-jung, but later switched partners to play with Jang Ye-na, starting in 2011. Starting in late 2013, his men's doubles partner was Lee Yong-dae. Together, they reached a world ranking of No.1 in August 2014.

Yoo was among 4 players reported to be retiring and hanging up his national team jersey after the Rio Olympics but during the Korea Open that September, it was revealed that he would be continuing to play on the national team after his partner Lee Yong-dae retired.  Yoo said that he wants to spend more time with his family.  After he and Lee won the Korea Open title, Yoo played an additional 9 international ranking events but his name was finally removed from the Korean national team list a few weeks after the 2017 Singapore Open.

Achievements

BWF World Championships 
Men's doubles

Asian Games 
Men's doubles

Asia Championships 
Men's doubles

Mixed doubles

Summer Universiade 
Mixed doubles

World Junior Championships 
Boys' doubles

Asian Junior Championships 
Boys' doubles

Mixed doubles

BWF Superseries (19 titles, 10 runners-up) 
The BWF Superseries, launched on 14 December 2006 and implemented in 2007, is a series of elite badminton tournaments, sanctioned by Badminton World Federation (BWF). BWF Superseries has two level such as Superseries and Superseries Premier. A season of Superseries features twelve tournaments around the world, which introduced since 2011, with successful players invited to the Superseries Finals held at the year end.

Men's doubles

Mixed doubles

  BWF Superseries Finals tournament
  BWF Superseries Premier tournament
  BWF Superseries tournament

BWF Grand Prix (12 titles, 5 runners-up) 
The BWF Grand Prix has two levels, the BWF Grand Prix and Grand Prix Gold. It is a series of badminton tournaments sanctioned by the Badminton World Federation (BWF) since 2007. The World Badminton Grand Prix sanctioned by International Badminton Federation (IBF) since 1983.

Men's doubles

Mixed doubles

  BWF Grand Prix Gold tournament
  BWF & IBF Grand Prix tournament

BWF International Challenge/Series (4 titles, 6 runners-up) 
Men's doubles

Mixed doubles

  BWF International Challenge tournament
  BWF International Series tournament

Record against selected opponents 
Men's doubles results with Ko Sung-hyun against Super Series finalists, World Championships semifinalists, and Olympic quarterfinalists.

  Cai Yun & Fu Haifeng 1–7
  Chai Biao & Guo Zhendong 1-2
  Guo Zhendong & Xu Chen 2–0
  Fang Chieh-min & Lee Sheng-mu 3–1
  Mathias Boe & Carsten Mogensen 0–6
  Lars Påske & Jonas Rasmussen 1–1
  Jonas Rasmussen & Mads Conrad-Petersen 1–0
  Mohammad Ahsan & Bona Septano 5–1
  Alvent Yulianto Chandra & Hendra Aprida Gunawan 4–1
  Markis Kido & Hendra Setiawan 2–3
  Hirokatsu Hashimoto & Noriyasu Hirata 4–2
  Jung Jae-sung & Lee Yong-dae 4–4
  Cho Gun-woo & Shin Baek-cheol 1–0
  Choong Tan Fook & Lee Wan Wah 1–0
  Koo Kien Keat & Tan Boon Heong 6–1
  Adam Cwalina & Michał Łogosz 1–0
  Bodin Isara & Maneepong Jongjit 0–3
  Howard Bach & Tony Gunawan 3–1

References

External links 

 
 

1986 births
Living people
Sportspeople from North Jeolla Province
South Korean male badminton players
Badminton players at the 2012 Summer Olympics
Badminton players at the 2016 Summer Olympics
Olympic badminton players of South Korea
Badminton players at the 2010 Asian Games
Badminton players at the 2014 Asian Games
Asian Games gold medalists for South Korea
Asian Games silver medalists for South Korea
Asian Games medalists in badminton
Medalists at the 2010 Asian Games
Medalists at the 2014 Asian Games
Universiade gold medalists for South Korea
Universiade medalists in badminton
Medalists at the 2007 Summer Universiade
World No. 1 badminton players
21st-century South Korean people